Eesti tippmodell, season 2 was the second installment of the Estonian adaptation of Tyra Banks' America's Next Top Model. The judging panel for the season consisted of Urmas Väljaots, Thomas Volkmann, and the host of the competition, Liisi Eesmaa. The season aired from October 2013 to January 2014.

The winner of the competition was 18-year-old Sandra Ude, from Tallinn. Her prize was a modelling contract with Elite Model Management, a cover of Estonian Cosmopolitan, and a trip to Rio de Janeiro.

Runner-up Kristine Smirnova was later selected as one of the fourteen finalists of Season 5 of Top Model po-russki, where she placed 10th overall.

Episode summaries

Episode 1
Casting episode.

Episode 2

First call-out: Sandra Ude	
Bottom two: Egle Hindrikson & Kairi Eliaser	
Eliminated: Egle Hindrikson

Episode 3

First call-out: Gerttu Pajusalu	
Bottom two: Kelly Illak & Sandra Ude	
Eliminated: Kelly Illak

Episode 4

Challenge winner: Kristine Smirnova
First call-out: Olga Krõlova	
Bottom two: Kristiina-Liisa Rätto & Maria Raja	
Eliminated: Maria Raja

Episode 5

First call-out: Kristine Smirnova
Bottom two: Gerttu Pajusalu & Grete Kinter
Eliminated: Gerttu Pajusalu

Episode 6

Challenge winner: Kristine Smirnova
First call-out: Kairi Eliaser	
Bottom two: Grete Kinter	& Kristiina-Liisa Rätto
Eliminated: Grete Kinter

Episode 7

First call-out: Monika Hatto	
Bottom two: Kristiina-Liisa Rätto & Olga Krõlova	
Eliminated: Kristiina-Liisa Rätto

Episode 8
Special guest: Asa Stensson

Episode 9

First call-out: Sandra Ude	
Bottom two: Arni Oštšepkova & Monika Hatto
Eliminated: None

Episode 10

First call-out: Olga Krõlova	
Bottom two:  Arni Oštšepkova & Kairi Eliaser
Eliminated: Arni Oštšepkova

Episode 11

First call-out: Kristine Smirnova	
Bottom two: Kairi Eliaser & Monika Hatto
Eliminated: Kairi Eliaser

Episode 12

First call-out: Kristine Smirnova	
Bottom two: Monika Hatto	& Olga Krõlova
Eliminated: Olga Krõlova

Episode 13

Recap episode.

Episode 14

Special guest: Asa Stensson
Final three: Kristine Smirnova, Monika Hatto & Sandra Ude	
Estonia's Next Top Model: Sandra Ude

Contestants
(ages are stated at start of contest)

Summaries

Call-out order

 The contestant was eliminated
 The contestant was immune from elimination
 The contestant was deemed to be the worst that week, but was not eliminated
 The contestant won the competition

 Episode 1 was the casting episode. During elimination, the girls were called in alphabetical order to learn whether or not they had proceeded to the main competition.
 In episode 4, Kristine was immune from elimination for winning the challenge.
 In episode 8, no panel was held. Only the season's go-sees and a photo shoot for Halens took place.
 In episode 9, no-one was eliminated.
 Episode 13 was the recap episode.

Photo shoot guide
Episode 2 photo shoot: B&W swimwear in the countryside and beach
Episode 3 photo shoot: B&W simplistic beauty shots
Episode 4 photo shoot: Nike sportswear jumping on a trampoline
Episode 5 photo shoot: Underwater beauties chained to the ocean floor
Episode 6 photo shoot: Glamorous actresses
Episode 7 photo shoots: Styled to rock while jumping in the air; rock lolita
Episode 8 photo shoot:  Halens catalog
Episode 9 photo shoot: Runway by a pond; posing in gowns with a male model on a tractor
Episode 10 photo shoots: Young vs old glamour; sports calendar
Episode 11 photo shoot: Icy winter queens; embodying Bratzillaz
Episode 12 photo shoots: Snake and jewelry beauty shots; Magnum ice cream campaign
Episode 14 photo shoot: Cosmopolitan covers

References

External links
 Official Show Website

Eesti tippmodell
2013 Estonian television seasons
2014 Estonian television seasons